NLB Banka Podgorica (full name: NLB Banka a.d. Podgorica) is a bank operating in Montenegro. Its parent bank is Slovenian NLB Group.

History
On 14 November 2021, NLB Banka Podgorica and Komercijalna banka Budva were integrated, following the acquisition of Komercijalna banka (Serbia) by the NLB Group. Komercijalna banka operated in Montenegro for 19 years, starting from November 2002.

See also
 List of banks in Montenegro

References

External links
 

Banks of Montenegro
Banks established in 2003